Goold Island is a national park in Queensland, Australia,  northwest of Brisbane. The island is close to the northern tip of Hinchinbrook Island off the coast from Cardwell in Rockingham Bay and is part of the Great Barrier Reef World Heritage Area.

It is covered mostly with open eucalypt forest, rainforested gullies and semi permanent creek water.

History

For many thousands of years before non-indigenous peoples arrived into the region, Goold Island, neighbouring islands and surrounding seas were occupied, used and enjoyed by generations of the Bandjin peoples ancestors, leaving behind an array of stone fish traps and shell middens still to be found on and around the island to this day.

Bandjin survivors of an often violent non-indigenous 'occupation' of the region continue to value and consider Goold Island as part of their sea country  and, in December 2005, they included Goold Island within Australia's and Queensland's first accredited 'Traditional Use of Marine Resource Agreement'

Camping

Campers are required to bring their own water and all camping equipment. Camping is by permit only and is limited numbers so it is best to book in advance. Access to the islands is by ferry, private boat or charter or sea kayak. Marine stingers are present during the warmer months.

Neighbouring Islands
The nearby Brook Islands are smaller and made up of North, Tween, Middle and South islands, the first three of which comprise the Brook Islands National Park. These islands are used mainly by nesting birds.  It is important not to disturb the birds during breeding seasons. Birds found here include the Torresian imperial-pigeon (estimated at over 40,000), bridled terns, black-naped terns, roseate terns and little terns. The beach stone-curlew also makes North Brook Island its home.

See also

 List of islands of Queensland
 Oyster Point
 Protected areas of Queensland

References

National parks of Far North Queensland
Islands of Far North Queensland
Uninhabited islands of Australia
Great Barrier Reef Marine Park